Peter Jeremy Baldwin (born 12 April 1951) is a former Australian politician. He was an Australian Labor Party member of the Australian House of Representatives from 1983 to 1998.

Baldwin was born in Aldershot, England. His family moved to Australia in 1958. He attended Normanhurst Boys' High School in Sydney, and later received a Bachelor of Electrical Engineering from the University of Sydney and a Bachelor of Arts from Macquarie University.

Baldwin was a member of the New South Wales Legislative Council from 1975 to 1982. In the 1970s he was prominent as a left-wing activist in the Australian Labor Party (ALP), in which position he sought to break the grip over the corrupt right-wing machine that controlled many Labor subdivisions in and near central Sydney. In the course of his campaign, he uncovered substantial and illegal doctoring of the party's account books in the Enmore branch of the ALP.

On 16 July 1980, he was brutally assaulted at his home in the nearby Sydney suburb of Marrickville. Pictures of his battered face dominated the front pages of newspapers around the nation, and led to increased pressure for reform of the party. No one was ever charged with the assault. Subsequently, it was alleged that the bashing was undertaken by underworld figure Tom Domican acting on suggestions from the Labor state secretary at the time, Graham Richardson. In March 2007 Richardson won a settlement against Fairfax of A$50,000 for defamation on the basis of this report.

After leaving state politics, Baldwin was selected for the federal Division of Sydney following the deselection of the previous right-aligned MP, Les McMahon. He ran on a platform similar to that advocated by Tony Benn in the British Labour Party, arguing for a revival of Labor's commitment to state ownership and for the implementation of industrial democracy. He held the seat from 1983 to 1998.  He served as Minister for Employment and Education Services in April 1990, Minister for Higher Education and Employment Services from May 1990 to March 1993, and Minister for Social Security from March 1993 to the defeat of the Keating government in March 1996.

Later career 

After leaving politics, Baldwin developed and co-founded Debategraph in March 2008, a web-based collaborative argument visualisation tool for mapping complex public policy debates which is used by the White House, the UK Foreign and Commonwealth Office, and the Amanpour series on CNN. He chairs the Blackheath Philosophy Forum.

References

 

1951 births
Living people
20th-century Australian politicians
Australian Labor Party members of the Parliament of Australia
Australian social democrats
Australian socialists
British emigrants to Australia
Government ministers of Australia
Labor Left politicians
Members of the Australian House of Representatives
Members of the Australian House of Representatives for Sydney
Members of the New South Wales Legislative Council
Australian democratic socialists